Toughest Man in Arizona is a 1952 American Western film directed by R. G. Springsteen, written by John K. Butler, and starring Vaughn Monroe, Joan Leslie, Edgar Buchanan, Victor Jory, Jean Parker and Harry Morgan. It was released on October 10, 1952, by Republic Pictures.

Plot

Cast    
Vaughn Monroe as Marshal Matt Landry
Joan Leslie as Mary Kimber
Edgar Buchanan as Jim Hadlock
Victor Jory as Frank Girard
Jean Parker as Della
Harry Morgan as Verne Kimber 
Ian MacDonald as Steve Girard
Lee MacGregor as Jerry Girard
Diana Christian as Joan Landry
Robert Hyatt as Davey Billings 
Charlita as Señorita
Nadine Ashdown as Jesse Billings
Francis Ford as Hanchette
Paul Hurst as Dalton

Production
Parts of the film were shot in Snow Canyon State Park in Utah.

References

External links 
 

1952 films
American Western (genre) films
1952 Western (genre) films
Republic Pictures films
Films directed by R. G. Springsteen
Films shot in Utah
Trucolor films
1950s English-language films
1950s American films